The 2002–03 NBA season was the Kings' 54th season in the National Basketball Association, and 18th season in Sacramento. The Kings were coming off their controversial Western Conference Finals defeat to the Los Angeles Lakers, who won the series in seven games. During the off-season, the Kings signed free agent Keon Clark, and later on in December signed Jim Jackson. Throughout the season, none of the Kings' players played a full season via suspension or injury, but they still managed to hold a successful 34–17 record at the All-Star break, and post a 59–23 record, two games less than their previous output in which they went 61–21, thus repeating as Pacific Division Champions once again.

Chris Webber averaged 23.0 points, 10.5 rebounds, 5.4 assists, 1.6 steals and 1.3 blocks per game, and was named to the All-NBA Second Team, while Peja Stojaković averaged 19.2 points and 5.5 rebounds per game, and Mike Bibby provided the team with 15.9 points and 5.2 assists per game, but only played 55 games due to a foot injury. In addition, Bobby Jackson contributed 15.2 points per game in 59 games, starting in 26 of them, and was named Sixth Man of the Year, while Vlade Divac provided with 9.9 points, 7.2 rebounds and 1.3 blocks per game, and Doug Christie contributed 9.4 points, 4.7 assists and 2.3 steals per game, and was named to the NBA All-Defensive First Team. Webber and Stojaković were both voted to play in the 2003 NBA All-Star Game in Atlanta. However, this time, Stojakovic was the only team representative as Webber was forced to withdraw due to a sprained ankle. Head coach Rick Adelman was selected to coach the Western Conference All-Stars. Webber also finished in tenth place in Most Valuable Player voting, while Christie finished in fifth place in Defensive Player of the Year voting.

After easily dispatching the Utah Jazz in five games in the Western Conference First Round, the team started to look like a title contender, but in Game 2 against the Dallas Mavericks in the Western Conference Semi-finals, their title hopes took a serious blow, when Webber suffered a knee injury while trying to catch a lob pass from Bibby, ending his season. Webber's knee required microfracture surgery in the following off-season. Without their team captain and MVP, the Kings lost the series in seven games. Following the season, Hedo Türkoğlu was traded to the San Antonio Spurs, while Scot Pollard was traded to the Indiana Pacers, Clark was dealt to the Utah Jazz, and Jackson signed as a free agent with the Houston Rockets.

For the season, the team sported new uniforms, adding purple primary road jerseys. The new uniforms would remain in use until 2008. As of 2023, this is the most recent Division title for the Kings, the longest such drought in the NBA.

Offseason

Draft picks

Roster

Roster Notes
 Point guard Brent Price missed the entire season due to a back injury.

Regular season

Season standings

z – clinched division title
y – clinched division title
x – clinched playoff spot

Record vs. opponents

Game log

|-style="background:#cfc;"
| 1
| October 29
| Cleveland
| 
| Damon Jones (18)
| Chris Webber (14)
| Bobby Jackson (5)
| ARCO Arena17,317
| 1–0
|-style="background:#cfc;"
| 2
| October 31
| Portland
| 
| Peja Stojaković (26)
| B. Jackson, Wallace (10)
| Vlade Divac (6)
| ARCO Arena17,317
| 2–0

|-style="background:#cfc;"
| 3
| November 2
| @ Memphis
| 
| Vlade Divac (24)
| Keon Clark (10)
| Vlade Divac (9)
| Pyramid Arena17,112
| 3–0
|-style="background:#fcc;"
| 4
| November 3
| @ Miami
| 
| Keon Clark (19)
| Vlade Divac (10)
| Christie, Clark, B. Jackson, Jones (3)
| American Airlines Arena15,468
| 3–1
|-style="background:#fcc;"
| 5
| November 5
| @ Orlando
| 
| Bobby Jackson (26)
| Lawrence Funderburke (12)
| Chris Webber (9)
| TD Waterhouse Centre14,292
| 3–2
|-style="background:#fcc;"
| 6
| November 6
| @ New York
| 
| Chris Webber (22)
| Chris Webber (11)
| Vlade Divac (7)
| Madison Square Garden19,763
| 3–3
|-style="background:#cfc;"
| 7
| November 8
| Memphis
| 
| Peja Stojaković (22)
| Chris Webber (17)
| Chris Webber (8)
| ARCO Arena17,317
| 4–3
|-style="background:#cfc;"
| 8
| November 10
| Atlanta
| 
| Chris Webber (27)
| Vlade Divac (10)
| Doug Christie (7)
| ARCO Arena17,317
| 5–3
|-style="background:#cfc;"
| 9
| November 13
| @ Golden State
| 
| Chris Webber (33)
| Bobby Jackson (9)
| Bobby Jackson (11)
| The Arena in Oakland18,369
| 6–3
|-style="background:#fcc;"
| 10
| November 15
| @ Seattle
| 
| Chris Webber (24)
| Keon Clark (9)
| Chris Webber (6)
| KeyArena17,072
| 6–4
|-style="background:#cfc;"
| 11
| November 17
| Orlando
| 
| Chris Webber (24)
| Webber, Divac (10)
| Webber, Türkoğlu (4)
| ARCO Arena17,317
| 7–4
|-style="background:#cfc;"
| 12
| November 19
| Chicago
| 
| Christie, B. Jackson (22)
| Vlade Divac (10)
| Divac, Webber (6)
| ARCO Arena17,317
| 8–4
|-style="background:#cfc;"
| 13
| November 20
| @ L.A. Clippers
| 
| Webber, B. Jackson (19)
| Vlade Divac (10)
| Doug Christie (9)
| Staples Center18,087
| 9–4
|-style="background:#cfc;"
| 14
| November 22
| Phoenix
| 
| Bobby Jackson (24)
| Chris Webber (13)
| Chris Webber (6)
| ARCO Arena17,317
| 10–4
|-style="background:#cfc;"
| 15
| November 23
| @ Portland
| 
| Chris Webber (24)
| Chris Webber (10)
| Vlade Divac (6)
| Rose Garden18,782
| 11–4
|-style="background:#cfc;"
| 16
| November 26
| @ Cleveland
| 
| Chris Webber (28)
| Chris Webber (11)
| Doug Christie (5)
| Gund Arena11,595
| 12–4
|-style="background:#fcc;"
| 17
| November 27
| @ Minnesota
| 
| Chris Webber (19)
| Chris Webber (11)
| Doug Christie (5)
| Target Center17,821
| 12–5
|-style="background:#cfc;"
| 18
| November 29
| L.A. Clippers
| 
| Bobby Jackson (31)
| Gerald Wallace (10)
| Christie, Divac (6)
| ARCO Arena17,317
| 13–5

|-style="background:#cfc;"
| 19
| December 1
| Houston
| 
| Gerald Wallace (21)
| Gerald Wallace (8)
| B. Jackson, Divac (5)
| ARCO Arena17,317
| 14–5
|-style="background:#cfc;"
| 20
| December 3
| Minnesota
| 
| Bobby Jackson (24)
| Chris Webber (11)
| Chris Webber (7)
| ARCO Arena17,317
| 15–5
|-style="background:#cfc;"
| 21
| December 4
| @ Denver
| 
| Chris Webber (31)
| Vlade Divac (14)
| Chris Webber (8)
| Pepsi Center13,002
| 16–5
|-style="background:#cfc;"
| 22
| December 6
| Denver
| 
| Doug Christie (23)
| Chris Webber (11)
| Doug Christie (6)
| ARCO Arena17,317
| 17–5
|-style="background:#cfc;"
| 23
| December 8
| @ San Antonio
| 
| Chris Webber (23)
| Chris Webber (13)
| Doug Christie (9)
| SBC Center16,873
| 18–5
|-style="background:#fcc;"
| 24
| December 10
| @ Houston
| 
| Chris Webber (30)
| Chris Webber (11)
| Bobby Jackson (6)
| Compaq Center13,158
| 18–6
|-style="background:#cfc;"
| 25
| December 14
| @ Utah
| 
| Chris Webber (27)
| Chris Webber (13)
| Webber, Christie (5)
| Delta Center19,911
| 19–6
|-style="background:#cfc;"
| 26
| December 15
| New Orleans
| 
| Chris Webber (28)
| Chris Webber (8)
| Chris Webber (7)
| ARCO Arena17,317
| 20–6
|-style="background:#cfc;"
| 27
| December 17
| Phoenix
| 
| Chris Webber (27)
| Webber, Divac (12)
| Vlade Divac (7)
| ARCO Arena17,317
| 21–6
|-style="background:#fcc;"
| 28
| December 19
| San Antonio
| 
| Chris Webber (23)
| Chris Webber (12)
| Chris Webber (6)
| ARCO Arena17,317
| 21–7
|-style="background:#fcc;"
| 29
| December 21
| @ Phoenix
| 
| Chris Webber (29)
| Chris Webber (15)
| Chris Webber (11)
| America West Arena18,133
| 21–8
|-style="background:#cfc;"
| 30
| December 22
| Golden State
| 
| Webber, Stojaković (20)
| Chris Webber (12)
| Chris Webber (6)
| ARCO Arena17,317
| 22–8
|-style="background:#cfc;"
| 31
| December 25
| @ L.A. Lakers
| 
| Chris Webber (25)
| Chris Webber (15)
| Chris Webber (6)
| Staples Center18,997
| 23–8
|-style="background:#fcc;"
| 32
| December 28
| Portland
| 
| Mike Bibby (22)
| Chris Webber (10)
| Mike Bibby (6)
| ARCO Arena17,317
| 23–9

|-style="background:#cfc;"
| 33
| January 4
| @ Denver
| 
| Mike Bibby (24)
| Peja Stojaković (10)
| Doug Christie (7)
| Pepsi Center17,393
| 24–9
|-style="background:#cfc;"
| 34
| January 5
| Miami
| 
| Mike Bibby (22)
| Vlade Divac (12)
| Christie, Divac (4)
| ARCO Arena17,317
| 25–9
|-style="background:#cfc;"
| 35
| January 7
| @ Milwaukee
| 
| Mike Bibby (20)
| Chris Webber (13)
| Chris Webber (6)
| Bradley Center16,072
| 26–9
|-style="background:#cfc;"
| 36
| January 9
| @ New Jersey
| 
| Peja Stojaković (23)
| Chris Webber (11)
| Doug Christie (9)
| Continental Airlines Arena20,049
| 27–9
|-style="background:#fcc;"
| 37
| January 10
| @ Minnesota
| 
| Chris Webber (30)
| Chris Webber (8)
| Mike Bibby (16)
| Target Center16,591
| 27–10
|-style="background:#cfc;"
| 38
| January 12
| Memphis
| 
| Peja Stojaković (30)
| Webber, Divac (10)
| Doug Christie (9)
| ARCO Arena17,317
| 28–10
|-style="background:#cfc;"
| 39
| January 15
| Dallas
| 
| Chris Webber (29)
| Chris Webber (15)
| Chris Webber (11)
| ARCO Arena17,317
| 29–10
|-style="background:#fcc;"
| 40
| January 18
| @ L.A. Clippers
| 
| Peja Stojaković (37)
| Vlade Divac (10)
| Mike Bibby (10)
| Staples Center20,037
| 29–11
|-style="background:#cfc;"
| 41
| January 20
| @ Golden State
| 
| Webber, Stojaković, Divac (16)
| Vlade Divac (11)
| Mike Bibby (9)
| The Arena in Oakland19,871
| 30–11
|-style="background:#cfc;"
| 42
| January 21
| New Jersey
| 
| Chris Webber (36)
| Chris Webber (15)
| Mike Bibby (10)
| ARCO Arena17,317
| 31–11
|-style="background:#cfc;"
| 43
| January 23
| @ Memphis
| 
| Chris Webber (26)
| Vlade Divac (11)
| Mike Bibby (8)
| Pyramid Arena13,228
| 32–11
|-style="background:#fcc;"
| 44
| January 24
| @ Atlanta
| 
| Chris Webber (32)
| Chris Webber (13)
| Webber, Bibby (6)
| Philips Arena15,697
| 32–12
|-style="background:#fcc;"
| 45
| January 26
| @ Toronto
| 
| Mike Bibby (30)
| Chris Webber (19)
| Chris Webber (10)
| Air Canada Centre19,800
| 32–13
|-style="background:#fcc;"
| 46
| January 28
| Utah
| 
| Peja Stojaković (32)
| Stojaković, Divac (6)
| Doug Christie (6)
| ARCO Arena17,317
| 32–14
|-style="background:#cfc;"
| 47
| January 30
| @ Seattle
| 
| Hedo Türkoğlu (22)
| Peja Stojaković (14)
| Vlade Divac (8)
| KeyArena16,286
| 33–14
|-style="background:#fcc;"
| 48
| January 31
| L.A. Lakers
| 
| Peja Stojaković (36)
| Hedo Türkoğlu (7)
| Doug Christie (5)
| ARCO Arena17,317
| 33–15

|-style="background:#fcc;"
| 49
| February 2
| @ Houston
| 
| Peja Stojaković (31)
| Stojaković, Divac, Bibby, Wallace (6)
| Vlade Divac (6)
| Compaq Center16,285
| 33–16
|-style="background:#cfc;"
| 50
| February 4
| @ Dallas
| 
| Mike Bibby (27)
| Peja Stojaković (14)
| Doug Christie (6)
| American Airlines Center20,102
| 34–16
|-style="background:#fcc;"
| 51
| February 5
| @ New Orleans
| 
| Peja Stojaković (20)
| Keon Clark (9)
| Bibby, Jones (4)
| New Orleans Arena17,217
| 34–17
|-style="background:#cfc;"
| 52
| February 11
| Washington
| 
| Peja Stojaković (20)
| Doug Christie (12)
| Mike Bibby (8)
| ARCO Arena17,317
| 35–17
|-style="background:#cfc;"
| 53
| February 14
| Seattle
| 
| Peja Stojaković (24)
| Keon Clark (14)
| Doug Christie (13)
| ARCO Arena17,317
| 36–17
|-style="background:#fcc;"
| 54
| February 16
| San Antonio
| 
| Vlade Divac (22)
| Keon Clark (13)
| Mike Bibby (8)
| ARCO Arena17,317
| 36–18
|-style="background:#cfc;"
| 55
| February 18
| Milwaukee
| 
| Peja Stojaković (26)
| Vlade Divac (19)
| Doug Christie (9)
| ARCO Arena17,317
| 37–18
|-style="background:#cfc;"
| 56
| February 20
| Boston
| 
| Christie, Clark (18)
| Clark, Stojaković (9)
| Doug Christie (9)
| ARCO Arena17,317
| 38–18
|-style="background:#cfc;"
| 57
| February 23
| New York
| 
| Chris Webber (20)
| Chris Webber (11)
| Chris Webber (9)
| ARCO Arena17,317
| 39–18
|-style="background:#cfc;"
| 58
| February 25
| Detroit
| 
| Chris Webber (19)
| Chris Webber (13)
| Vlade Divac (5)
| ARCO Arena17,317
| 40–18
|-style="background:#cfc;"
| 59
| February 27
| @ Dallas
| 
| Peja Stojaković (36)
| Keon Clark (11)
| Bibby, Christie, Webber, Divac (6)
| American Airlines Center20,059
| 41–18

|-style="background:#fcc;"
| 60
| March 1
| @ San Antonio
| 
| Chris Webber (36)
| Chris Webber (9)
| Mike Bibby (8)
| SBC Center18,797
| 41–19
|-style="background:#cfc;"
| 61
| March 3
| Philadelphia
| 
| Chris Webber (29)
| Vlade Divac (13)
| Chris Webber (8)
| ARCO Arena17,317
| 42–19
|-style="background:#cfc;"
| 62
| March 5
| Minnesota
| 
| Chris Webber (25)
| Webber, Stojaković (11)
| Mike Bibby (5)
| ARCO Arena17,317
| 43–19
|-style="background:#cfc;"
| 63
| March 7
| @ Utah
| 
| Webber, Bibby (24)
| Chris Webber (15)
| Chris Webber (8)
| Delta Center19,911
| 44–19
|-style="background:#cfc;"
| 64
| March 9
| Indiana
| 
| Mike Bibby (17)
| Chris Webber (12)
| Chris Webber (6)
| ARCO Arena17,317
| 45–19
|-style="background:#fcc;"
| 65
| March 13
| @ Phoenix
| 
| Chris Webber (22)
| Chris Webber (11)
| Chris Webber (9)
| America West Arena18,184
| 45–20
|-style="background:#cfc;"
| 66
| March 14
| Toronto
| 
| Chris Webber (26)
| Chris Webber (10)
| Doug Christie (10)
| ARCO Arena17,317
| 46–20
|-style="background:#fcc;"
| 67
| March 16
| Dallas
| 
| Peja Stojaković (30)
| Chris Webber (15)
| Chris Webber (9)
| ARCO Arena17,317
| 46–21
|-style="background:#cfc;"
| 68
| March 18
| Golden State
| 
| Peja Stojaković (20)
| Chris Webber (10)
| Doug Christie (6)
| ARCO Arena17,317
| 47–21
|-style="background:#cfc;"
| 69
| March 20
| L.A. Lakers
| 
| Chris Webber (26)
| Chris Webber (11)
| Christie, B. Jackson (4)
| ARCO Arena17,317
| 48–21
|-style="background:#cfc;"
| 70
| March 22
| @ Portland
| 
| Peja Stojaković (30)
| Chris Webber (15)
| Mike Bibby (8)
| Rose Garden20,580
| 49–21
|-style="background:#cfc;"
| 71
| March 23
| Houston
| 
| Chris Webber (24)
| Vlade Divac (12)
| Chris Webber (6)
| ARCO Arena17,317
| 50–21
|-style="background:#cfc;"
| 72
| March 27
| L.A. Clippers
| 
| Chris Webber (23)
| Vlade Divac (13)
| Doug Christie (6)
| ARCO Arena17,317
| 51–21
|-style="background:#cfc;"
| 73
| March 29
| @ Chicago
| 
| Peja Stojaković (27)
| Chris Webber (10)
| Jim Jackson (7)
| United Center22,638
| 52–21
|-style="background:#fcc;"
| 74
| March 30
| @ Detroit
| 
| Chris Webber (22)
| Chris Webber (8)
| Christie, Divac (4)
| The Palace of Auburn Hills22,076
| 52–22

|-style="background:#cfc;"
| 75
| April 1
| @ Indiana
| 
| Peja Stojaković (26)
| Chris Webber (14)
| Doug Christie (7)
| Conseco Fieldhouse17,088
| 53–22
|-style="background:#cfc;"
| 76
| April 2
| @ Washington
| 
| Chris Webber (28)
| Chris Webber (9)
| Vlade Divac (7)
| MCI Center20,173
| 54–22
|-style="background:#cfc;"
| 77
| April 4
| @ Boston
| 
| Chris Webber (27)
| Chris Webber (11)
| Mike Bibby (10)
| FleetCenter18,624
| 55–22
|-style="background:#cfc;"
| 78
| April 6
| @ Philadelphia
| 
| Webber, Stojaković (21)
| Chris Webber (11)
| Chris Webber (8)
| First Union Center20,702
| 56–22
|-style="background:#cfc;"
| 79
| April 8
| Seattle
| 
| Chris Webber (20)
| Keon Clark (8)
| Chris Webber (7)
| ARCO Arena17,317
| 57–22
|-style="background:#fcc;"
| 80
| April 10
| @ L.A. Lakers
| 
| Webber, Stojaković (24)
| Chris Webber (9)
| Bibby, Christie (5)
| Staples Center18,997
| 57–23
|-style="background:#cfc;"
| 81
| April 11
| Denver
| 
| Chris Webber (22)
| Chris Webber (14)
| Jason Williams (8)
| ARCO Arena17,317
| 58–23
|-style="background:#cfc;"
| 82
| April 16
| Utah
| 
| Chris Webber (15)
| Divac, B. Jackson (7)
| Chris Webber (7)
| ARCO Arena17,317
| 59–23

Playoffs

|- align="center" bgcolor="#ccffcc"
| 1
| April 19
| Utah
| W 96–90
| Chris Webber (27)
| Chris Webber (11)
| Bobby Jackson (6)
| ARCO Arena17,317
| 1–0
|- align="center" bgcolor="#ccffcc"
| 2
| April 21
| Utah
| W 108–95
| Peja Stojaković (29)
| Clark, Divac (7)
| Bobby Jackson (6)
| ARCO Arena17,317
| 2–0
|- align="center" bgcolor="#ffcccc"
| 3
| April 26
| @ Utah
| L 104–107
| Chris Webber (24)
| Chris Webber (11)
| Mike Bibby (7)
| Delta Center19,911
| 2–1
|- align="center" bgcolor="#ccffcc"
| 4
| April 28
| @ Utah
| W 99–82
| Peja Stojaković (27)
| Chris Webber (11)
| Mike Bibby (9)
| Delta Center19,911
| 3–1
|- align="center" bgcolor="#ccffcc"
| 5
| April 30
| Utah
| W 111–91
| Chris Webber (26)
| Chris Webber (11)
| Mike Bibby (7)
| ARCO Arena17,317
| 4–1
|-

|- align="center" bgcolor="#ccffcc"
| 1
| May 6
| @ Dallas
| W 124–113
| Peja Stojaković (26)
| Christie, Stojaković (9)
| Chris Webber (9)
| American Airlines Center20,525
| 1–0
|- align="center" bgcolor="#ffcccc"
| 2
| May 8
| @ Dallas
| L 110–132
| Chris Webber (31)
| Bobby Jackson (8)
| Doug Christie (9)
| American Airlines Center20,491
| 1–1
|- align="center" bgcolor="#ffcccc"
| 3
| May 10
| Dallas
| L 137–141 (2OT)
| Peja Stojaković (39)
| Bobby Jackson (11)
| Doug Christie (7)
| ARCO Arena17,317
| 1–2
|- align="center" bgcolor="#ccffcc"
| 4
| May 11
| Dallas
| W 99–83
| Hedo Türkoğlu (17)
| Peja Stojaković (12)
| Doug Christie (7)
| ARCO Arena17,317
| 2–2
|- align="center" bgcolor="#ffcccc"
| 5
| May 13
| @ Dallas
| L 93–112
| Doug Christie (21)
| Christie, Pollard (9)
| Doug Christie (7)
| American Airlines Center20,556
| 2–3
|- align="center" bgcolor="#ccffcc"
| 6
| May 15
| Dallas
| W 115–109
| Peja Stojaković (24)
| Jim Jackson (12)
| Doug Christie (6)
| ARCO Arena17,317
| 3–3
|- align="center" bgcolor="#ffcccc"
| 7
| May 17
| @ Dallas
| L 99–112
| Mike Bibby (25)
| Peja Stojaković (9)
| Bibby, Jackson (5)
| American Airlines Center20,595
| 3–4
|-

Player statistics

Season

Playoffs

Awards and records
 Doug Christie, NBA All-Defensive First Team
 Bobby Jackson, Sixth Man of the Year
 Peja Stojaković, 2003 NBA All-Star Game
 Peja Stojaković, Player of the Week (Mar. 23)
 Chris Webber, 2003 NBA All-Star Game
 Chris Webber, Player of the Week (Dec. 15)
 Chris Webber, Player of the Month (Dec. 2002)
 Chris Webber, All-NBA Second Team
 Rick Adelman Western Conference All-Stars Head Coach

Transactions

References

See also
 2002–03 NBA season

Sacramento Kings seasons
Sacramento
Sacramento
Sacramento